Yuliy Borisovich Briner (July 11, 1920 – October 10, 1985), known professionally as Yul Brynner, was a Russian actor. He was best known for his portrayal of King Mongkut in the Rodgers and Hammerstein stage musical The King and I, for which he won two Tony Awards, and later an Academy Award for Best Actor for the film adaptation. He played the role 4,625 times on stage and became known for his shaved head, which he maintained as a personal trademark long after adopting it for The King and I. Considered one of the first Russian-American film stars, he was honored with a ceremony to put his handprints in front of Grauman's Chinese Theatre in Hollywood in 1956, and also received a star on the Hollywood Walk of Fame in 1960.

In 1956, Brynner received the National Board of Review Award for Best Actor for his portrayal of Rameses II in the Cecil B. DeMille epic The Ten Commandments and General Bounine in Anastasia. He was also well known as the gunman Chris Adams in The Magnificent Seven (1960) and its first sequel Return of the Seven (1966), along with roles as the android "The Gunslinger" in Westworld (1973), and its sequel, Futureworld (1976).  In addition to his film credits, he also worked as a model and photographer and was the author of several books.

Early life in Russia

Yul Brynner was born Yuliy Borisovich Briner on July 11, 1920, in the city of Vladivostok. He had Swiss-German, Russian, Buryat (Mongol) and purported Romani ancestry. He was born at his parents' home, a four-story house on 15 Aleutskaya Street, Vladivostok into a wealthy Swiss-Russian family of landowners and silver mining developers in Siberia and the Far East. At the time the territory was controlled by the Far Eastern Republic and Vladivostok was partially under Japanese control. The Briner family enjoyed a good life at their four-story mansion. In October 1922, the Red Army occupied Vladivostok, and most of the Briner family's wealth was confiscated and nationalized at the end of the Russian Civil War. The Briners were stripped of home ownership, but the family, including an elder sister, Vera, continued living in their house under a temporary status.

Later in his life, Brynner humorously enjoyed telling tall tales and exaggerating his background and early life for the press, claiming that he was born Taidje Khan of a Mongol father and Roma mother on the Russian island of Sakhalin. He occasionally referred to himself as Julius Briner, Jules Bryner or Youl Bryner. The 1989 biography by his son, Rock Brynner, clarified some of these issues.

Brynner's father, Boris Yuliyevich Briner, was a mining engineer and inventor of Swiss-German and Russian descent, who graduated from Mining University in Saint Petersburg in 1910. The actor's grandfather, Jules Briner, was a Swiss citizen who moved to Vladivostok in the 1870s and established a successful import/export company. Brynner's paternal grandmother, Natalya Yosifovna Kurkutova, was a native of Irkutsk and a Eurasian of partial Buryat ancestry.

Brynner's mother, Marousia Dimitrievna (née Blagovidova), hailed from the Russian intelligentsia and studied to be an actress and singer; she was allegedly of Russian Romani ancestry. Brynner felt a strong personal connection to the Romani people and in 1977 he was named honorary president of the International Romani Union, a title that he kept until his death.

In 1922, after the formation of the Soviet Union, Yul's father Boris Briner was required to relinquish his Swiss citizenship and all family members were made Soviet citizens. Brynner's father's work required extensive travel, and in 1923, in Moscow he fell in love with a beautiful actress, Katerina Ivanovna Kornakova, who was the ex-wife of actor Aleksei Dikiy, and stage partner of Michael Chekhov at the Moscow Art Theatre. Many years later, Katerina Kornakova would help Brynner with her letter of recommendation asking Michael Chekhov to employ him in his theatre company in America. In 1924, Yul's father divorced his mother and continued to support her and his children. His father also adopted a girl, because his new wife was childless, and many years later, after the death of his father, Brynner would take his adopted sister into his care. The father and son relationship remained complex and emotionally traumatic for Brynner. After leaving his son and daughter with their mother in Vladivostok, Boris Briner and Katerina Ivanovna Kornakova briefly lived in Moscow, but eventually they moved to Harbin, Manchuria, which at that time remained under Japanese control. There the family established business in international trade.

In China
In 1927, Brynner, with his mother and his elder sister, Vera (January 17, 1916 – December 13, 1967), emigrated from Vladivostok, Russia to Harbin, China. There, young Yul and his sister Vera attended a school run by the YMCA.

In 1930, Brynner's father gave him an important birthday present - an acoustic guitar. That guitar and the following music lessons made a lasting influence on Brynner's artistic development. His natural curiosity, creativity, and imagination became now focused on mastering the guitar technique and studying classical and contemporary music. Brynner studied music under the guidance of his elder sister, Vera, who was a classically trained opera singer. After several years of arduous studies, Brynner became an accomplished guitar player and singer.

In France and Switzerland
In 1933, fearing a war between China and Japan, Brynner, with sister Vera and their mother, moved to Paris. There, on the 15th of June, 1935, the fourteen-year-old Brynner made his debut at the "Hermitage" cabaret in Paris, where he played his guitar and sang in the Russian and Roma languages. After initial success, he continued performing at various Parisian nightclubs, sometimes accompanying his sister, playing and singing Russian and Roma songs. At that time, Brynner was a student at a lyceum in Paris, where he studied French. His classmates and teachers were aware of his strong character, as he was often involved in fist fighting. In the summer of 1936, Brynner worked as a lifeguard at a resort beach in Le Havre. There he joined a French circus troupe, trained as a trapeze acrobat and worked with a circus troupe for several years, but after sustaining a back injury he left the circus troupe owing to near-unbearable pain, causing him to take narcotics; soon Brynner developed a drug dependency. One day, while buying opium from a local dealer, Brynner met Jean Cocteau (1889-1963) and the two became lifelong friends. Cocteau introduced Brynner to Pablo Picasso, Salvador Dalí, Marcel Marceau, Jean Marais, and the bohemian milieu of Paris. The experience and connections eventually helped him in his multifaceted career of acting, directing, and producing.

By 1937, Brynner's efforts to control his spinal pain with opium and other drugs eventually led to drug abuse. Seventeen-year-old Brynner became a drug addict and the family tried to help him treat the illness. He spent a year in Lausanne, Switzerland treating his drug addiction at a Swiss clinic for drug addicts and at Lausanne University Hospital under the generous patronage of his aunt Vera Dmitrievna Blagovidova-Briner, his mother's sister. His aunt Vera Dmitrievna was a physician trained at a medical school in Saint Petersburg, Russia, before the revolution, and later practiced in China and Switzerland. The year-long treatment in Switzerland, which included hypnotherapy, had a lasting effect on Brynner's health. Yul never used illicit drugs again in his life, though he became addicted to cigarette smoking which gradually deteriorated his lungs and negatively impacted his health much later in his life.

Back in China
In 1938 Brynner's mother was diagnosed with leukemia, and the two briefly moved back to China seeking help from his father, who continued supporting them. In Harbin, Brynner's father had a lucrative trade business and lived with his second wife, actress Katerina Ivanovna Kornakova, who was a former member of the Moscow Art Theatre. Katerina Kornakova gave Brynner his first professional acting lessons by showing him scenes from her repertoire at Moscow Art Theatre, and instructing him how to respond to her lines using his voice tone and body language. During their first lessons, Katerina Kornakova demonstrated and explained to Brynner the principles of Konstantin Stanislavsky's school of acting, and the innovative ideas of Michael Chekhov, who founded his own school. Brynner was excited and impressed with the new experience, enabling him to act on a much higher level than his work as a circus acrobat. His father initially tried to prepare his son for a management position at their family business, but changed his mind after watching several acting lessons and witnessing Brynner's happiness.

Katerina Kornakova was impressed with Brynner's intellectual and physical abilities and recommended him to study acting with her former partner Michael Chekhov. Brynner took the letter of recommendation from his stepmother and also accepted money and blessings from his father. With the generous support from both his father and stepmother, Brynner became encouraged and confident in his future success as an actor. At the same time, Brynner's mother's illness progressed and required special medical treatment that was only possible in the United States, so Brynner took his mother on a long trip across the world.

In America

His final destination was New York City, where his sister already lived. Vera, a singer, starred in The Consul on Broadway in 1950 and appeared on television in the title role of Carmen. She later taught voice in New York.

During World War II Brynner worked as a French-speaking radio announcer and commentator for the US Office of War Information, broadcasting to occupied France. He also worked for the Voice of America, broadcasting in Russian to the Soviet Union during WWII. At the same time, during the war years, he studied acting in Connecticut with the Russian actor Michael Chekhov, and also worked as a truck driver and stage hand for Michael Chekhov's theatre company. Brynner was introduced to Michael Chekhov on the recommendation from his father's second wife, actress Katerina Ivanovna Kornakova who was a former acting partner of Chekhov at the Moscow Art Theatre.

By the time he turned 21, Brynner had already made several international journeys around the world traveling between Asia, Europe, and America. Such extensive traveling contributed to his exposure to a variety of cultural experiences and enriched his creativity.

In 1941, Brynner performed as a singer and guitar player at the "Blue Angel" club in New York. There he met and fell in love with Marlene Dietrich. She was 40, Brynner was 21; it was a mutually beneficial relationship, and the two became lifelong friends.

Career

1940s
In 1941, Brynner made his stage debut in Broadway production of Shakespeare's Twelfth Night that premiered on the 2nd of December 1941. In it, Brynner appeared as Fabian and delivered only a few lines in his broken English with a noticeable Russian accent. The job helped to start adding English to the list of languages he spoke, which included French, Japanese, Hungarian, and some Russian. The show was soon closed, as were many other Broadway productions, after the attack on Pearl Harbor as America declared war on Japan and Nazi Germany. Soon Brynner found a job as a radio commentator delivering war propaganda in French and Russian at the Voice of America radio station. He had little acting work during the next few years but among other acting stints he co-starred in a 1946 production of Lute Song with Mary Martin. He also did some modeling work and was photographed nude by George Platt Lynes.

Brynner's first marriage was to actress Virginia Gilmore in 1944, and soon after he began working as a director at the new CBS television studios. In 1948 and 1949, he directed and also appeared on television alongside his wife in the first two seasons of Studio One and also appeared in other shows.

Brynner made his film debut in Port of New York, released in November 1949.

1950s

The King and I
The next year, at the urging of Martin, Brynner auditioned for Rodgers and Hammerstein's new musical in New York. He recalled that, as he was finding success as a director on television, he was reluctant to go back on the stage. Once he read the script, however, he was fascinated by the character of the King and was eager to perform in the project.

Brynner's role as King Mongkut in The King and I (4,625 times on stage) became his best-known role. He appeared in the original 1951 production and later touring productions as well as a 1977 Broadway revival, a London production in 1979 and another Broadway revival in 1985. He won the Tony Award for Best Featured Actor in a Musical for the first of these Broadway productions and a special Tony for the last. He reprised the role in the 1956 film version, for which he won an Academy Award as Best Actor and in Anna and the King, a short-lived TV version on CBS in 1972. Brynner is one of only ten people who have won both a Tony and an Academy Award for the same role.

In 1951 Brynner shaved his head for his role in The King and I. Following the huge success of the Broadway production and subsequent film Brynner continued to shave his head for the rest of his life, though he wore a wig for certain roles. Brynner's shaven head was unusual at the time and his striking appearance helped to give him an exotic appeal. Some fans shaved off their hair to imitate him, and a shaven head was often referred to as the "Yul Brynner look".

Brynner's second motion picture was the film version of The King and I (1956) with Deborah Kerr. It was a huge success critically and commercially.

Cecil B. de Mille hired Brynner for The Ten Commandments (1956) to play Ramesses II opposite Charlton Heston after seeing him in the stage version of The King and I, telling Brynner backstage that he was the only person for the role. He rounded out his year with Anastasia (1956), co-starring with Ingrid Bergman under the direction of Anatole Litvak. Both films were big hits and Brynner became one of the most in-demand stars in Hollywood. 

MGM cast Brynner as one of The Brothers Karamazov (1958), which was another commercial success. Less so was The Buccaneer (1958), in which Brynner played Jean Lafitte; he co-starred with Heston and the film was produced by De Mille and directed by Anthony Quinn.

MGM used Brynner again in The Journey (1959), opposite Kerr under the direction of Litvak, but the film lost money. So too did The Sound and the Fury (1959) based on the novel by William Faulkner with Joanne Woodward.

However, Brynner then received an offer to replace Tyrone Power, who had died during the making of Solomon and Sheba (1959) with Gina Lollobrigida. The movie was a huge hit, which postponed the development of a planned Brynner film about Spartacus. When the Kirk Douglas film Spartacus (1960) came out, Brynner elected not to make his own version.

1960s
Brynner tried comedy with two films directed by Stanley Donen: Once More, with Feeling! (1960) and Surprise Package (1960), but public response was underwhelming. He made a cameo in Testament of Orpheus.

Although the public received him well in The Magnificent Seven (1960), a Western adaptation of Seven Samurai for The Mirisch Company, the picture proved a disappointment on its initial release in the U.S. However, it was hugely popular in Europe and has had enduring popularity. Its ultimate success led to Brynner's signing a three-picture deal with the Mirisches. The film was especially popular in the Soviet Union, where it sold 67million tickets. He then made a cameo in Goodbye Again (1961).

Brynner focused on action films. He did Escape from Zahrain (1962), with Ronald Neame as director, and Taras Bulba (1962), with Tony Curtis for J. Lee Thompson. Both films were commercial disappointments; Taras Bulba was popular but failed to recoup its large cost.

The first film under Brynner's three-picture deal with Mirisch was Flight from Ashiya (1963) with George Chakiris. It was followed by Kings of the Sun (1963), also with Chakiris, directed by Thompson. Neither film was particularly popular; nor was Invitation to a Gunfighter (1964), a western. Morituri (1965), opposite Marlon Brando, failed to reverse the series of unsuccessful movies. He had cameos in Cast a Giant Shadow (1966) and The Poppy Is Also a Flower (1966).

Brynner enjoyed a hit with Return of the Seven (1966), reprising his role from the original. Less popular were Triple Cross (1966), a war movie with Christopher Plummer; The Double Man (1967), a spy thriller; The Long Duel (1967), an Imperial adventure tale opposite Trevor Howard; Villa Rides (1968), a Western; and The File of the Golden Goose (1969).

Brynner went to Yugoslavia to star in a war film, Battle of Neretva (1969). He supported Katharine Hepburn in the big-budget flop The Madwoman of Chaillot (1969). Brynner appeared in drag (as a torch singer) in an unbilled role in the Peter Sellers comedy The Magic Christian (1969).

Later career
Brynner went to Italy to make a Spaghetti Western, Adiós, Sabata (1970) and supported Kirk Douglas in The Light at the Edge of the World (1971). He remained in lead roles for Romance of a Horsethief (1971) and a Western Catlow (1971).

Brynner had a small role in Fuzz (1972) then reprised his most famous part in the TV series Anna and the King (1972) which ran for 13 episodes.

After Night Flight from Moscow (1973) in Europe, Brynner created one of his iconic roles in the cult hit film Westworld (1973) as the 'Gunslinger', a killer robot. His next two films were variations on this performance: The Ultimate Warrior (1975) and Futureworld (1976).

Brynner returned to Broadway in Home Sweet Homer, a notorious flop musical. His final movie was Death Rage (1976), an Italian action film.

Personal life
Although Brynner had become a naturalized U.S. citizen, aged 22, in 1943, while living in New York as an actor and radio announcer, he renounced his US citizenship at the U.S. Embassy in Bern, Switzerland, in June 1965 because he had lost his tax exemption as an American resident working abroad. He had stayed too long in the United States meaning he would be bankrupted by his tax and penalty debts imposed by the Internal Revenue Service.

In 2006, Rock Brynner, son of Yul, wrote a book about his father and his family history titled Empire and Odyssey: The Brynners in Far East Russia and Beyond. He regularly returned to Vladivostok, the city of his father's birth, for the "Pacific Meridian" Film Festival.

Health
In September 1983, Brynner suffered a sore throat, his voice changed and doctors found a lump on his vocal cords. In Los Angeles, only hours before his 4,000th performance in The King and I, he received the test results indicating that he had inoperable lung cancer while his throat was not affected. Brynner had begun smoking heavily at age 12. Although he had quit in 1971, his promotional photos often still showed him with a cigarette in hand, or a cigar in his mouth. He and the national tour of the musical were forced to take a few months off while he underwent radiation therapy which produced a side effect that damaged his throat and made it impossible for him to sing or speak easily. The tour then resumed.

In January 1985, the tour reached New York for a farewell Broadway run. Aware he was dying, Brynner gave an interview on Good Morning America discussing the dangers of smoking and expressing his desire to make an anti-smoking commercial. The Broadway production of The King and I ran from January 7 to June 30 of that year, with Mary Beth Peil as Anna. His last performance, a few months before his death, marked the 4,625th time he had played the role of the King.

Other interests
In addition to his work as a director and performer, Brynner was an active photographer and wrote two books. His daughter Victoria put together Yul Brynner: Photographer, a collection of his photographs of family, friends, and fellow actors, as well as those he took while serving as a UN special consultant on refugees.

Brynner wrote Bring Forth the Children: A Journey to the Forgotten People of Europe and the Middle East (1960), with photographs by himself and Magnum photographer Inge Morath, and The Yul Brynner Cookbook: Food Fit for the King and You (1983 ).

He was also an accomplished guitarist and singer. In his early period in Europe, he often played and sang gypsy songs in Parisian nightclubs with Aliosha Dimitrievitch. He sang some of those same songs in the film The Brothers Karamazov. In 1967, Dimitrievitch and he released a record album The Gypsy and I: Yul Brynner Sings Gypsy Songs (Vanguard VSD 79265).

Relationships and marriages

Brynner married four times, his first three marriages ending in divorce. He fathered three children and adopted two. His first wife (1944–1960) was actress Virginia Gilmore with whom he had one child, Yul "Rock" Brynner (born December 23, 1946). He was nicknamed "Rock" when he was six years old in honor of boxer Rocky Graziano. He is a historian, novelist, and university history lecturer at Marist College in Poughkeepsie, New York and Western Connecticut State University in Danbury, Connecticut.

Yul Brynner had a long affair with Marlene Dietrich, who was 19 years his senior, beginning during the first production of The King and I.

In 1959, Brynner fathered a daughter, Lark Brynner, with Frankie Tilden, who was 20 years old. Lark lived with her mother and Brynner supported her financially. His second wife, from 1960 to 1967, Doris Kleiner is a Chilean model whom he married on the set during shooting of The Magnificent Seven in 1960. They had one child, Victoria Brynner (born November 1962), whose godmother was Audrey Hepburn. Belgian novelist and artist Monique Watteau was also romantically linked with Brynner, from 1961 to 1967.  In 1969, it was rumored that Roman Polanski made an adult video /"threesome" with Sharon Tate and Brynner.

His third wife (1971–1981), Jacqueline Simone Thion de la Chaume (1932–2013), a French socialite, was the widow of Philippe de Croisset (son of French playwright Francis de Croisset and a publishing executive). Brynner and Jacqueline adopted two Vietnamese children: Mia (1974) and Melody (1975). The first house Brynner owned was the Manoir de Criquebœuf, a 16th-century manor house in northwestern France that Jacqueline and he purchased. His third marriage broke up, reportedly owing to his 1980 announcement that he would continue in the role of the King for another long tour and Broadway run, as well as his affairs with female fans and his neglect of his wife and children.

On April 4, 1983, aged 62, Brynner married his fourth and final wife, Kathy Lee (born 1957), a 26-year-old ballerina from Ipoh, Malaysia, whom he had met in a production of The King and I. They remained married for the last two years of his life. His longtime close friends Meredith A. Disney and her sons Charles Elias Disney and Daniel H. Disney attended Brynner and Lee's final performances of The King and I.

Death
Brynner died of lung cancer on October 10, 1985, at New York Hospital at the age of 65. Brynner was cremated and his ashes were buried in the grounds of the Saint-Michel-de-Bois-Aubry Orthodox monastery, near Luzé, between Tours and Poitiers in France.

Anti-smoking campaign
Prior to his death, with the help of the American Cancer Society, Brynner created a public service announcement using a clip from the Good Morning America interview. A few days after his death, it premiered on all major US television networks and in other countries.

Brynner used the announcement to express his desire to make an anti-smoking commercial after discovering he had cancer, and his death was imminent. He then looked directly into the camera for 30 seconds and said, "Now that I'm gone, I tell you: Don't smoke. Whatever you do, just don't smoke. If I could take back that smoking, we wouldn't be talking about any cancer. I'm convinced of that." His year of birth, in one version of the commercial, was incorrectly given as 1915.

Legacy

In Russia

On September 28, 2012, a 2.4-m-tall statue was inaugurated at Yul Brynner Park, in front of the home where Brynner was born at Aleutskaya St. No. 15 in Vladivostok, Russia. Created by local sculptor Alexei Bokiy, the monument was carved in granite monolith that was acquired in China and delivered to Vladivostok, Russia. The grounds for the park were donated by the city of Vladivostok, which also paid additional costs. Vladivostok Mayor Igor Pushkariov, US Consul General Sylvia Curran, and Brynner's son, Rock, participated in the ceremony, along with hundreds of local residents.

The Briner family cottage in suburban Vladivostok is now a Yul Brynner museum.

In the U.S.
In 1956, Brynner imprinted his hands and feet into the concrete pavement in front of the Graumann's Chinese Theatre in Hollywood, California. In 1960, Brynner was honored with a star on the Hollywood Walk of Fame at 6162 Hollywood Boulevard.

In 2022, a podcast was launched celebrating his filmography, entitled "Here's Looking at Yul, Kid."

In France
Brynner spent many years living, studying, and working in France, and his last will stated his wish to be buried there. His resting place at :fr:Abbaye royale Saint-Michel de Bois-Aubry has a memorial mention dedicated to him.

Filmography

Short subjects:
 On Location with Westworld (1973)
 Lost to the Revolution (1980) (narrator)

Box office ranking

At the height of his career, Brynner was voted by exhibitors as among the most popular stars at the box office:
 1956 – 21st (US)
 1957 – 10th (US), 10th (UK)
 1958 – 8th (US)
 1959 – 24th (US)
 1960 – 23rd (US)

Select stage work
 Twelfth Night (1941) (Broadway)
 Lute Song (1946) (Broadway and US national tour)
 The King and I (1951) (Broadway and US national tour)
 Home Sweet Homer (1976) (Broadway)
 The King and I (1977) (Broadway, London and US national tour)
 The King and I (1985) (Broadway)

Awards
 In 1952, he received the Tony Award for Best Featured Actor in a Musical for his portrayal of the King in The King and I. In 1985, he received a special Tony Award honoring his 4625 performances in The King and I.
 He won the 1956 Academy Award for Best Actor for his portrayal of the King of Siam in the film version of The King and I, and made the "Top 10 Stars of the Year" list in both 1957 and 1958.
 In 1960, he was inducted into the Hollywood Walk of Fame with a motion pictures star at 6162 Hollywood Boulevard.

References

Further reading

External links

 
 
 

1920 births
1985 deaths
American male musical theatre actors
American people of Buryat descent
American people of Mongolian descent
American people of Russian descent
American people of Swiss-German descent
Best Actor Academy Award winners
Burials in France
Deaths from lung cancer in New York (state)
Donaldson Award winners
Male Spaghetti Western actors
Naturalized citizens of the United States
People from Vladivostok
People of the United States Office of War Information
People who renounced United States citizenship
Soviet emigrants to the United States
Special Tony Award recipients
Tony Award winners